Road to Ruin is the fourth studio album by American punk rock band the Ramones, released on September 22, 1978, through Sire Records as LP record, 8 track cartridge & audio cassette. It was the first Ramones album to feature new drummer Marky Ramone, who replaced Tommy Ramone. Tommy left the band due to low sales of previous albums as well as stress he experienced while touring; however, he stayed with the band to produce the album (credited as T. Erdelyi) with Ed Stasium. The artwork's concept was designed by Ramones fan Gus MacDonald and later modified by John Holmstrom to include Marky instead of Tommy. The album includes the well-known track "I Wanna Be Sedated".

The album incorporated musical elements that were less prominent in punk rock, such as heavy metal-influenced guitar solos and 1960s-style ballads. The songs on Road to Ruin are considered by some as an attempt to get the band more airplay. The album did not  sell as well as the band had hoped, peaking at number 103 on the Billboard 200, more than 50 places behind its predecessor, Rocket to Russia. However, Road to Ruin lives on decades later as a fan favorite, as well as a popular album for them on Spotify. A decade after its release, a successful music video for "I Wanna Be Sedated" appeared in 1988; it is their second most-played song on Spotify. This album has had multiple re-releases with new work from producer Ed Stasium.

Conception
After the band's previous album Rocket to Russia saw poor album sales, drummer Tommy Ramone left his performing position to focus primarily on producing for the band. After Tommy suggested they search for a new drummer, they began looking in New York City based clubs. While at CBGBs, Ramones bassist Dee Dee Ramone approached Marc Bell (Marky Ramone) – who was his friend and had previously been the drummer in Richard Hell and the Voidoids – asking him if he was interested in joining the Ramones. A month after this encounter, manager Danny Fields formally asked Marky to audition for the band. Around twenty others auditioned to be the drummer, though Johnny, Joey and Dee Dee wanted to hire Marky after his performances of "I Don't Care" and "Sheena Is a Punk Rocker". Marky stayed close to Tommy's straightforward technique, with a bit more technical sophistication.

Three weeks after Marky joined the band, the Ramones began recording Road to Ruin in Midtown Manhattan at Mediasound Studios, the premises of a former Episcopalian Church. Album engineer Ed Stasium explained the recording process: "After Tommy left the band, we went straight into working on the Road to Ruin album with Marky Ramone. We rehearsed with Marky, just getting it down. Then we went into the studio, recorded, and mixed the record at Media Sound. We spent a lot of money, and the entire summer, on Road to Ruin." Music critic John Young of Rolling Stone called the album's production "clean and simple", but pointed out that the track "Bad Brain" contained "funny noises" suggested by the producers in between drum beats, which prevents the song from having the humorous asperity that was intended.

The artwork's concept was originated by Ramones fan Gus MacDonald, who illustrated the members performing with a lobster claw coming out of an amplifier and a snake around their feet. Following the drawing's completion, MacDonald sent it to the band and they decided to make it their Road to Ruin album cover. This sketch did, however, include original drummer Tommy, so the drawing had to be modified to depict Marky instead. This alteration was undertaken by artist John Holmstrom, a Punk magazine associate and designer.

Lyrics and composition
The album introduced some characteristics that were new to Ramones records, such as guitar solos, acoustic rhythm guitars, and ballads. These attributes were debated by the band's fans as well as critics, who questioned whether these changes sought to expand their musical fashion or the band was simply selling out and abandoning their punk-rock edge. Though "Bad Brain", "I Wanted Everything", and "I'm Against It" each serves as basic punk songs to intensify the behavior of the audience, the most popular tracks on the album are the pieces which part from their initial style. "Bad Brain" would inspire the name of the pioneering hardcore band.

Tommy Ramone said of the album's content:

The album opens with the midtempo piece "I Just Want to Have Something to Do", which contains lyrics pertaining to ambivalence and anomie. In the song, Joey manages to rhyme "Second Avenue" with "chicken vindaloo". The next track, "I Wanted Everything", is compared to Merle Haggard's song "If We Make It Through December", being called its "punk counterpart" by Rock: A Canadian Perspective author Larry Starr. "Questioningly" is a ballad focusing on failing relationships and heartbreak. "Don't Come Close" uses elements that can also be heard in country music, such as twang.

"She's the One" suggests that the band will continue making records, while "Needles and Pins" is a cover. Rolling Stone critic Charles Young noted that the song could have easily been a joke, but was not since Joey "really puts his guts into these antiquated but beautiful lyrics and pulls it off." "I Wanna Be Sedated" was written by Joey while in the hospital where he was treated for burns on his face and in his throat. The injury was the result of an exploding kettle full of boiling water which served to treat sinuses. The album concludes with "It's a Long Way Back", which was written by Dee Dee and depicts his childhood in Germany.

Release
With the band's slight change in musical style, material included on the album was intended to gain a sense of mainstream acceptance, though the band members felt that this was not achieved. Tommy relates: "Road to Ruin was a flop Stateside, even though it had been a very deliberate attempt to secure American radioplay." The album's lack of commercial success showed for a negative impact on the members' morale, and this exasperation would continue into the band's future records and tours. On the US Billboard 200, Road to Ruin peaked at number 103, while on the UK Albums Chart it reached 32. The album also debuted at 25 on the Swedish Sverigetopplistan chart. The drive to sell more albums in the United States failed, which is evident when comparing the charting positions to Road to Ruins predecessor Rocket to Russia, which peaked at 49 on the Billboard 200.

Reception

Initially, Road to Ruin received mixed reviews from critics. Roy Trakin of the New York Rocker called the album "uneven" and "sometimes lazy", and preferred Tommy's drumming style over Marky's, writing: "...his light, distinctive, jazz-influenced drumming is sorely missed on Road to Ruin as Marky is of the heads-down basher school." Jon Savage of Sounds felt that the Ramones' music had become formulaic and accused the band of "calculated negativity". Rolling Stone critic Charles M. Young found the album to be neither as humorous nor as innovative as the Ramones' debut, but noted that the band was not at all "losing its grip". He observed that the band had modified their style because "dumb" people did not understand the music, while "smart" people did. Young cited "I Wanna Be Sedated" as the album's "killer cut", comparing it to "Blitzkrieg Bop", "Loudmouth", and "Cretin Hop". In a highly positive review, The Village Voices Robert Christgau wrote that the band was constantly "topping itself", and implied that each track on the album was very listenable except "Bad Brain", the theme of which he called "repetitious".

Cash Box said of "Don't Come Close" that "the production values emphasize clear guitar lines" and "Joey's lead vocals are effective and reminiscent of early British rockers." Record World called it "a fine pop outing" and said that "The vocals are familiar but the mid-'60s English rock beat and instrumentation have a smoother and finer edge."

Critical acclaim for Road to Ruin did not fully transpire until many decades after its release. AllMusic senior editor Stephen Thomas Erlewine found that the album does not reach the quality of the Ramones' previous albums, taking issue with its "undistinguished" songs, but the music nonetheless "sounds good" despite lacking in "exuberant energy or abundant hooks". In a later retrospective review for AllMusic, Tim Sendra was more enthusiastic, writing that the more elaborate arrangements "worked well with the more diverse songs the band brought to the album".

The album is popular among the band's work today, often considered a fan favorite. In 2014 the album was voted their third best in a Rolling Stone top 10 article.

The hardcore punk band Bad Brains took their name from the song "Bad Brain". The title of Supergrass' 2005 album Road to Rouen is a reference to Road to Ruin.

Track listing
All tracks originally credited to the Ramones (except "Needles and Pins"). Actual writers are listed alongside the tracks where applicable.

Notes
Tracks 13–14 first issued on Hey Ho! Let's Go: The Anthology, Rhino #75817 (7/20/99).
Track 15 is from the original soundtrack album Rock 'n' Roll High School, Sire #6070 (4/79). Produced and engineered by Ed Stasium. Remix engineer: Joel Soifer.
Track 16 is previously unreleased. Outtake from Road to Ruin sessions.
Track 17 was first issued on All the Stuff (And More!) Volume 2, Sire #26618 (7/91). Produced by Tommy Erdelyi, recorded during demo sessions for Pleasant Dreams.

2018 40th anniversary deluxe edition (Sire/Rhino)
Disc 1
Original album 
Features both the remastered original mixes (tracks 1-12) and the 40th anniversary Road revisited mix (tracks 13-24). Track listings as per original album.
Tracks 13-24 mixed by Ed Stasium at Eight Palms Ranchero, Poway, California, 2018.

Disc 2

Notes
 All tracks produced and engineered by T. Erdelyi and Ed Stasium, assisted by Ray Janos and Ramona Jan, at Mediasound, New York, 1978.
 Tracks 1 and 2 are outtakes from the Road to Ruin sessions. 
 Tracks 3, 5-18 mixed by T. Erdelyi and Ed Stasium, 1978.
 Track 4 remixed by Ed Stasium, 1979.
 Tracks 1, 2, 19-23 mixed by Ed Stasium, 2018.
 Track 24 remixed by Ed Stasium and Paul Robb at Right Track Recording, New York, 1988. Edits by Paul Brown, concept by Kevin Laffey.
 All tracks, except 3, 4 and 24, previously unissued.

Disc 3

Notes
 All tracks mixed live by Ed Stasium, and aired on WNEW-FM in New York. Sourced from Tommy Ramone's original cassette of the console recording. All tracks previously unissued.

LP
Original album - 40th anniversary Road revisited mix
 Track listing as per original album.

Personnel
Adapted from AllMusic, except where noted.

Ramones
 Joey Ramone – vocals
 Johnny Ramone – guitar
 Dee Dee Ramone – bass, backing vocals
 Marky Ramone – drums

Additional musicians
 Ed Stasium – guitar, bass, backing vocals 
 Tommy Ramone – guitar

Technical
 T. Erdelyi (Tommy Ramone) – producer, engineer
 Ed Stasium – producer, engineer
 Ray Janos – assistant engineer
 Ramona Jan – assistant engineer
 Greg Calbi – mastering
 Gus MacDonald – front cover concept
 John Holmstrom – front cover art
 John Gillespie – art direction
 Spencer Drate – design
 Danny Fields – photography
 Bob Gruen – photography
 Chip Rock – photography

Charts

References
Citations

Bibliography
 
 
 
 
 
 
 
 
 
 

1978 albums
Ramones albums
Sire Records albums
Rhino Records albums
Albums produced by Ed Stasium
Albums produced by Tommy Ramone